May Sim (born 1962) is an American philosopher and professor of philosophy at College of the Holy Cross. She is a former president of the Metaphysical Society of America (2013). She is noted for her comparative studies of Confucian and Aristotelian ethics. She is deeply influenced by Alasdair MacIntyre, who supervised her doctoral dissertation at Vanderbilt University.

Publications

References

External links
  at the College of the Holy Cross

20th-century American philosophers
Philosophy academics
1962 births
Presidents of the Metaphysical Society of America
Living people
Vanderbilt University alumni
College of the Holy Cross faculty
American women philosophers
20th-century American women